Ognissanti (All Saints) may refer to one of the following Italian churches:

Ognissanti, Florence, Tuscany
Ognissanti, Mantua, Lombardy
Ognissanti, Trani, Apulia
Ognissanti, Venice, Veneto

Also may refer into the following buildings and structures:
Porta Ognissanti, Padua, Veneto